Mauranthemum is a genus of flowering plants in the daisy family.

 Species
 Mauranthemum decipiens (Pomel) Vogt & Oberpr. - Spain, Algeria, Morocco
 Mauranthemum gaetulum (Batt.) Vogt & Oberpr. - Algeria, Morocco
 Mauranthemum paludosum (Poir.) Vogt & Oberpr.	- Spain, Portugal, Balearic Islands, Morocco, Algeria, Libya, Tunisia
 Mauranthemum reboudianum (Pomel) Vogt & Oberpr. - Algeria, Morocco

References

Asteraceae genera
Anthemideae